Sergei Alekseyevich Galkin (born 6 November 1964) is a Russian professional football coach and a former player. He is an assistant manager with the Under-21 team of FC Arsenal Tula.

Playing career
As a player, he made his debut in the Soviet Second League in 1982 for FC Dynamo Vologda. Galkin played in the Soviet First League with FC Dynamo Vologda and FC Chkalovets Novosibirsk.

References

1964 births
Living people
Soviet footballers
Russian footballers
Russian football managers
FC Sibir Novosibirsk players
Association football defenders
FC Dynamo Vologda players
FC Bulat Cherepovets players